This is a list of notable footballers who have played for Portsmouth. The aim is for this list to include all players that have played 100 or more senior matches for the club. Other players who are deemed to have played an important role for the club can be included, but the reason for their notability should be included in the 'Notes' column.

For a list of all Portsmouth players with a Wikipedia article, see Category:Portsmouth F.C. players, and for the current squad see the main Portsmouth F.C. article.

Table

Players should be listed in chronological order according to the year in which they first played for the club, and then by alphabetical order of their surname. Appearances and goals should be for first-team competitive games and include substitute appearances, but exclude wartime matches.

Statistics are up to date as of 2 April 2021.

Notes

References 
 
 Soccerbase stats (use Search for...on left menu and select 'Players' drop down)
 

Players
 
Lists of association football players by club in England
Portsmouth-related lists
Association football player non-biographical articles